St. Augustine Beach is a city in St. Johns County, Florida, United States. The population was 6,176 at the 2010 census. As of 2018, the population estimated by the U.S. Census Bureau was 7,026.

Geography

St. Augustine Beach is located at  (29.843657, –81.272206).

According to the United States Census Bureau, the city has a total area of 1.9 square miles (5.0 km), all land.

Demographics

At the 2000 census there were 4,683 people in 2,213 households, including 1,263 families, in the city. The racial makeup of the city was 96.80% White, 0.32% African American, 0.41% Native American, 1.15% Asian, 0.02% Pacific Islander, 0.43% from other races, and 0.88% from two or more races. Hispanic or Latino of any race were 2.75%.

Of the 2,213 households 18.8% had children under the age of 18 living with them, 46.6% were married couples living together, 7.8% had a female householder with no husband present, and 42.9% were non-families. 28.8% of households were one person and 10.3% were one person aged 65 or older. The average household size was 2.12 and the average family size was 2.57.

The age distribution was 15.4% under the age of 18, 11.0% from 18 to 24, 26.2% from 25 to 44, 27.5% from 45 to 64, and 19.9% 65 or older. The median age was 43 years. For every 100 females, there were 95.0 males. For every 100 females age 18 and over, there were 92.8 males.

The median household income was $59,484. Males had a median income of $34,883 versus $26,250 for females. The per capita income for the city was $57,905. About 1.4% of families and 2.7% of the population were below the poverty line, including 2.0% of those under age 18 and 3.3% of those age 65 or over.

Local government

Commission
St. Augustine Beach is organized with a commission-manager form of government; voters elect a City Commission which consists of five members who serve four-year, staggered terms. The five members are elected equally as Commissioners then the Commissioners vote to appoint a member as Mayor and Vice Mayor.

The City Commission meets monthly on the first Monday of the month excluding holidays. The Commission appoints a City Manager, who carries out the will of the Commission and handles day-to-day business.

Elected officials

Transportation

Highways 
  State Road A1A runs north–south.
  County Road A1A runs north–south.
  State Road 312 runs east–west

Buses 
Bus service is operated by the Sunshine Bus Company. Though based in the city, it also serves neighboring St. Augustine including the historic districts, and the rest of the county. Buses operate mainly between shopping centers across town, but a few go to Hastings and Jacksonville, where one can connect to JTA for additional service across Jacksonville.

Education

It is in the St. Johns County School District.

The zoned elementary schools include: R. B. Hunt Elementary School, which serves almost all of the city; and W. D. Hartley Elementary School, which serves a small portion.

The zoned middle schools include: Sebastian Middle School, which serves almost all of the city; and Gamble Rogers Middle School, which serves a small portion.

The zoned high schools include: St. Augustine High School, which serves almost all of the city; and Pedro Menendez High School, which serves a small portion.

St. Johns County Public Library maintains the Anastasia Island Beach Branch.

References

External links

 City of St. Augustine Beach official site

Cities in St. Johns County, Florida
Beaches of St. Johns County, Florida
Cities in the Jacksonville metropolitan area
Cities in Florida
Populated coastal places in Florida on the Atlantic Ocean
Beaches of Florida
1959 establishments in Florida
Populated places established in 1959